The 1969 All-Ireland Minor Hurling Championship was the 39th staging of the All-Ireland Minor Hurling Championship since its establishment by the Gaelic Athletic Association in 1928.

Wexford entered the championship as the defending champions. However, they were defeated in the Leinster semi-final.

On 7 September 1969, Cork won the championship following a 2-15 to 3-6 defeat of Kilkenny in the All-Ireland final. This was their ninth All-Ireland title and their first in two championship seasons.

Results

Leinster Minor Hurling Championship

Semi-finals

Final

Munster Minor Hurling Championship

Quarter-finals

Semi-finals

Final

All-Ireland Minor Hurling Championship

Semi-final

Final

References

External links
 All-Ireland Minor Hurling Championship: Roll Of Honour

Minor
All-Ireland Minor Hurling Championship